Yury Aleksandrovich Dud (born 11 October 1986) is a Russian journalist known primarily for his informational online videos distributed as a YouTuber. He has additionally been deputy director-general of the sports website  since 2018, previously serving as the editor-in-chief from 2011 to 2018.

His name is also internationally known as Yuri Dud. In terms of his reporting career, he has garnered attention for being one of the most popular YouTubers in the history of the Russian Federation, with his personal account possessing over ten million subscribers as of early 2022. His series of socio-political interviews have included multiple opponents of the 2022 Russian invasion of Ukraine and related foreign policies of the nation. This has brought him widespread attention from worldwide audiences but also opposition from Vladimir Putin's state hierarchy. Человек во время войны (English: Man in the Time of War / Man in War) is Dud's latest film project, with it being released on 11 April 2022 based upon his research into the Ukrainian refugee crisis.

In 2017, he launched his YouTube channel  where he interviews individuals from Russia and other post-Soviet states.

Early life and family
Dud was born on 11 October 1986 in the city of Potsdam in East Germany to the head of BMSTU military department, professor, PhD in military science Alexander Petrovich Dud, and Anna Stepanovna Dud, a school teacher of chemistry. In 1990, the family moved to Moscow. Yury has lived in Russia since the age of four. He considers himself to be of Ukrainian origin and particularly Russian by identity.

Career

Early career

Dud played football as a child and dreamt of becoming a goalkeeper, but had to give up trainings because of asthma. However, this passion got him interested in sports journalism. In 2001, Dud began working at the Russian newspaper Izvestia as a freelance journalist, and became a staff journalist at the age of 16. In 2007, Dud began working for the sports magazine PROSPORT.ru, which was then in the sports division of NTV Plus. In 2008, he graduated from the MSU Faculty of Journalism.

From 2011 to 2013, Dud hosted the TV show "Headbutt" on Russia-2. From 2015 to 2017, he hosted the show "KultTura" on the newly launched TV channel Match TV. The show was taken off the air due to poor ratings and a lack of sponsors.

In 2018, he moved to the position of deputy director-general.

In February 2017, Dud launched the YouTube channel , where he interviews famous figures, including musicians (mainly rappers), politicians, journalists, film directors, and business people. The channel quickly became a success; his interview with popular influencer Nastya Ivleeva in 2018 received over 30 million views. By June 2020, the channel received over one billion views.

In September 2019, Dud was awarded GQ Russia's Person of the Year prize in the Face From the Screen category. In his speech at the ceremony, he urged his colleagues to break the silence over police brutality, corruption, and election rigging. The next day, the Kremlin's spokesman, Dmitry Peskov, told media that he does not advise for those words to be projected onto the whole of society.

By 2021, Dud became the most popular Russian blogger. In his article "D — Dud" as part of his "Words of Russia" project,  wrote that Dud became a voice of the new generation in his country. In his interviews he openly speaks with guests on topics that are unimaginable to state media. Saprykin stated that he thinks that Dud with his work reinvents recent Russian history showing it as it is, clear of state propaganda. By November 2021, the channel had more almost 10 million subscribers and his 2020 documentary "How the World's IT Capital Works" had received over 40 million views. Forbes estimated Dud's annual income in 2021 to be $1.8 million dollars.

On 17 June 2021, the authorities opened a case against Dud for allegedly distributing "drug propaganda" in his interviews with a Ukrainian blogger and a Russian rapper, despite adding the disclaimer "drugs are evil, don't consume them" at the beginning of the videos. In October, he was sentenced to a 100,000 ruble fine. Dud tried to appeal the ruling, but the Moscow City Court declined his appeal.

Following a mass crackdown in Belarus on the media, the GUBOPiK of the Belarusian interior ministry labelled three videos on his channel as extremist in 2022. The videos were about stand-up comedian Slava Komissarenko, who fled Belarus and openly opposes the government of Alexander Lukashenko. The Committee to Protect Journalists criticized the decision and called on Belarusian authorities to reverse this and "stop using the country’s extremism legislation to silence independent journalism".

Documentaries 
Over time, Yury Dud's YouTube channel grew from one-to-one interviews to documentary films on social issues and recent Russian history.

Kolyma
In April 2019, the documentary film Kolyma was published which is about Stalinist repressions in the region of Kolyma and the emergence of the Gulag camps and their legacy.

Beslan. Remember
In September 2019, a film about the victims and survivors of the Beslan school siege in 2004 was released. In the opening of the film, Dud states: "Our state made mistakes that led to this tragedy. By giving maximum care to the victims it can earn forgiveness and, later, trust of its people". The film is based on interviews of witnesses, hostages, journalists, and bureaucrats who were there during the tragedy, including Ruslan Aushev, the sole negotiator who entered the sieged school and led 26 hostages outside. The film received over 10 million views in four days on YouTube. Its release marked the 15th anniversary of the Beslan tragedy, where no documentaries or reports were given that day on state channels.

Criticism from state media followed the release of the film with Vladimir Solovyov being one of the most vocal. The newspaper Argumenty i Fakty accused Dud of whitewashing the terrorists. , who witnessed the events, criticized Dud for what he called was a biased description of the storming of the school by Russian forces. Independent publications including Novaya Gazeta praised the documentary for what it described as a professional, calm, and thoroughly detailed analysis.

HIV in Russia: An Epidemic No One Talks About
In February 2020, HIV in Russia: An Epidemic No One Talks About was published, receiving over 13 million views in its first week of release. Initially, Dud's team wanted to tell its audience how to not become part of the statistics where over one million people in Russia live with HIV. But during the production of the film, they understood the issue of constant condemnation and discrimination against those living with HIV. After its release, the politician Fedot Tumusov organized a screening in the State Duma in order to motivate other deputies to work on the issue. The head of the Audit Chamber of Russia, Alexei Kudrin, ordered his department to carefully examine support measures provided to those living with HIV in the country. According to Google Analytics, searches for HIV tests in Russia increased by 56 times after the film was released. The head of the Federal Centre for the Prevention and Control of the Spread of AIDS, Vadim Pokrovsky told media that the number of people willing to perform HIV tests doubled.

How the World's IT Capital Works
In April 2020, a film about Silicon Valley Russian-speaking entrepreneurs was released. Many of them (like Mikita Mikado or Andrey Doronichev from Google) were yet unknown to wide Russian audience and 'woke up famous' with social network accounts bursting with thousands of new followers. Although the film was generally praised, it was criticized for making the Silicon Valley business environment seem too positive, as it did not tell the story of hardship and failure.

Why They Torture in Russia
In December 2021, a film about torture in modern-day Russia was released. In the film, Dud interviews victims of torture as well as human rights activists and organizations. The film opens up on the issue of violence and torture in Russia's penitential facilities that stay undisclosed and uninvestigated, where often the victims are unable to sue their offenders. Even in those cases that are opened, the offenders are usually acquitted.

Man in War
On 11 April 2022, a film about the work of volunteers helping refugees from Ukraine titled Человек во время войны (English: Man in the Time of War / Man in War) came out based on Dud's research.

Personal life
Dud is married to Olga Dud (née Boneva) and has two children.

In February 2022, after Russia launched its invasion of Ukraine, Dud condemned the invasion and publicly called for Russian troops to be withdrawn from Ukraine; his anti-war Facebook post received over 1 million likes. Dud described the invasion as an "imperial frenzy" that he doesn't want to be a part of. A complaint about his anti-war posts were filed to the Prosecutor-General of Russia's Office and Ministry of Justice, calling for Dud to be designated as a "foreign agent". On 15 April, Dud was designated by the Ministry of Justice as a "foreign agent". However, he had left his country to continue working from Istanbul.

Awards
 2016 – Winner of GQ Russia's Person of the Year award in the Face from TV category with Yevgeny Savin
 2017 – Winner of GQ Russia's Person of the Year award in the Face From the Screen category
 2017 – Laureate of Redkollegia's prize in October
 2019 – Winner of GQ Russia's Person of the Year award in the Face From the Screen category
 2020 – Forbes Life Hero of the Year Award

See also

 Documentary filmmaker
 YouTuber

References

Sources

External links
Official website 

1986 births
Living people
People from Potsdam
Moscow State University alumni
Russian journalists
Russian sports journalists
Russian male journalists
Russian YouTubers
Russian people of Ukrainian descent
Journalism as a Profession Awards winners
Russian documentary filmmakers
Russian activists against the 2022 Russian invasion of Ukraine
People listed in Russia as media foreign agents
Redkollegia award winners